Michael Corcoran (1827–1863) was an Irish-born American general in the Union Army during the American Civil War.

Michael Corcoran or Mike Corcoran may also refer to:

Michael Corcoran (bishop) (died 1819), Roman Catholic Bishop in Kildare and Leighlin
Michael Corcoran (nun) (1846–1927), Irish nun and Superior General of the Loreto Order
Michael Corcoran (Medal of Honor) (1847–1919), United States Army corporal
Mike Corcoran (baseball) (1858–1927), Major League Baseball pitcher
Michael George Corcoran (born 1963), American politician in the Missouri House of Representatives
Mike Corcoran (canoeist) (born 1965), Irish slalom canoeist
Michael Corcoran (lobbyist) (born 1967), American lobbyist based in Florida
Michael Corcoran (musician) (born 1972), American musician